Isaac Morrison (born 1745) was a captain during the Revolutionary War, in the 1st New Jersey Regiment. He served under Matthias Ogden and testified at his court martial.

References

1745 births
People from Somerset County, New Jersey
Continental Army officers from New Jersey
Year of death missing